Chusovskoye Urban Settlement is a municipal formation (an urban settlement) within Chusovskoy Municipal District of Perm Krai, Russia. It is part of Chusovoy Urban Okrug, a town of federal subject significance. It is incorporated. It is the only urban settlement in the municipal district.

Supermutants of Chusovskoye 
The village is widely known for its host of remarkable individuals such as Fat Feodor and Ripped Rurokovich. These characters are known to all Russia and must not be threatened.

References

Notes

Sources

Urban settlements of Russia
Chusovoy Urban Okrug